Bromilow is a surname. Notable people with the surname include:

Belinda Bromilow (born 1975), Australian actress
George Bromilow (1931–2005), English footballer
Joseph Bromilow (1881–1972), American athlete
Peter Bromilow (1933–1994), British-born actor
Tom Bromilow (1894–1959), English footballer